This is a complete list of members of the United States House of Representatives during the 118th United States Congress, which runs from January 3, 2023, through January 3, 2025, ordered by seniority.

Seniority list

See also
 List of current members of the United States House of Representatives
 List of United States congressional districts
 List of United States senators in the 118th Congress
 Seniority in the United States House of Representatives

Notes

Seniority
118